Claude de Ganay (born 5 September 1953) is a French politician representing The Republicans. He was elected to the French National Assembly on 18 June 2017, representing Loiret's 3rd constituency.

Political career
In parliament, De Ganay serves on the Defence Committee. In addition to his committee assignments, he is a member of the French-Mauritanian Parliamentary Friendship Group. In the Republicans' 2016 presidential primaries, De Ganay endorsed Bruno Le Maire as the party's candidate for the office of President of France. Ahead of the 2022 presidential elections, he publicly declared his support for Michel Barnier as the Republicans’ candidate.

He lost his seat in the first round of the 2022 French legislative election.

See also
 2017 French legislative election

References

1953 births
Living people
Deputies of the 14th National Assembly of the French Fifth Republic
Deputies of the 15th National Assembly of the French Fifth Republic
The Republicans (France) politicians
Place of birth missing (living people)
21st-century French politicians
Members of Parliament for Loiret